Thomas Croker may refer to:
 Thomas Crofton Croker, Irish antiquary
 Thomas Francis Dillon Croker, his son, British antiquary and poet